A slungshot is a maritime tool consisting of a weight, or "shot", affixed to the end of a long cord often by being wound into the center of a knot called a "monkey's fist".  It is used to cast line from one location to another, often mooring line.  The cord end is tied to the heavier line and the weighted end of the slungshot is thrown across the intervening space where a person picks it up and pulls the line across.

As a weapon
The slungshot was often used as a civilian or improvised weapon; however, the rope was much shorter for use as a weapon.  The cord is tied around the wrist, and the weight is carried in the hand or the pocket of the user. A slungshot may be swung in a manner similar to that of a flail or a blackjack.

China and Japan
Slungshots were also used in China and Japan, under other names and were sometimes weighted on both ends, such as with Kusari-fundo, manrikigusari, and other variants.  A variant called "loaded sleeves," consisted of weights concealed in long, flowing sleeves.

Robert van Gulik stated in the postscript of his book The Willow Pattern A Judge Dee Mystery, that in 1935 when he was in Peking, he was told how "loaded sleeves" facilitated an unexpected escape for a group of foreign nuns threatened by a mob during an anti-Western uprising in China. The cornered nuns, believing they were going to be killed, reportedly raised their hands to pray. The people standing nearest incorrectly identified the bulky objects in the upraised folds of cloth, interpreting them to be dangerous "loaded sleeves". They backed away, opening a path through the crowd, and the nuns escaped. The bulky objects were their breviaries, which the nuns habitually carried in the sleeves of their robes. 

United States
Abraham Lincoln's most notable criminal trial occurred in 1858 when he successfully defended "Duff" Armstrong on a charge of killing another with a slung shot. They were widely used by criminals and street gang members in the 19th century as they had the advantage of being easy to make, silent, and very effective, particularly against an unsuspecting opponent. This gave them a dubious reputation, similar to that of switchblade knives in the 1950s, and they were outlawed in many jurisdictions.  The use as a criminal weapon continued at least up until the early 1920s.

Carrying or attempting to use a slungshot is a felony in the states of California, Oklahoma, Massachusetts, and Michigan.  It is a gross misdemeanor in the states of Nevada and Washington.  In Minnesota, it can be either a misdemeanor or a felony, depending upon the circumstances. As of 2010, in the state of New Hampshire, possession of a slungshot carries a misdemeanor penalty.  In March 2016, Florida repealed its longstanding first-degree misdemeanor law forbidding the carrying of a concealed slungshot. Tennessee's going armed statute lists the slungshot (as "slingshot") in its list of prohibited weapons.

Other names
They were also known as "slingshots," but had nothing to do with what is now known as a slingshot.  Many jurisdictions' laws against "slingshots" were actually meant to refer to slungshots.

References

Further reading
Escobar, Robert. Saps, Blackjacks and Slungshots: A History of Forgotten Weapons, Catoblepas Press, Columbus, 2018. 
Stone, George Cameron.  A Glossary of the Construction, Decoration and Use of Arms and Armor, Jack Brussel, New York, N.Y., 1961, pg. 568.
Van Gulik, Robert: The Red Pavilion, Charles Scribner's Sons, New York, N.Y., 1961.  (Discussion of the use of weights on chains in story text)
Van Gulik, Robert: The Willow Pattern, Charles Scribner's Sons, New York, N.Y., 1965.  Loaded sleeves are explained in the afterword.

Flail weapons